One Last Question is a short film completed in 2015, directed by Prathamesh Krisang. It is inspired from a true story in 1998 from a blog titled, "Agia to Oxford" by Manjit Nath. The film takes the viewer back to the Indian state of Assam in 1998. It is basically a memoir of a person who had been on the verge of abandoning education and taking up arms against the state, but who was then counseled by his father, which set him on the right and, hence, a better direction. The pivotal character of Tultul’s father in the film has been played by the eminent actor, Adil Hussain.

Written and directed by Prathamesh Krisang. Starring Adil Hussain as 'Deuta', which means 'father, the 30 minute film revolves around a 15-year-old boy named Tultul and his three friends. They are inspired to join an extremist group which has been fighting to gain independence for Assam from the Republic of India. The story is about hope and how teenagers go astray in awe for extremist leaders and their elusive promises. It also portrays how parents can guide their children by informing them of a better way to bring about changes.

The film was premiered on in multiple national and international film festivals. Numerous scenes have been shot at exotic locations around Assam. It took one and a half year for the filmmaker to get the film ready, and this includes getting it crowd funded in the middle of the production . It depicts the state of affairs in insurgency-ridden state of Assam from the Republic of India and how youth is getting attracted by militant outfits. The story evolves as the four friends turn from innocence to violence and are self-imposed to decide their own future.

The film has received a deluge of positive reviews by critics and has won numerous awards and honors in several various film festivals. From winning the Golden Palm Award at 10th Mexico International Film Festival 2015, the film has been honored time and again in film festivals.

Plot
The film revolves around a 15-year-old boy named Tultul and his three friends, who are inspired to join a militant outfit after having been incited with patriotic sentiments by a rebel leader. The trio of Tultul’s friends try to absorb Tultul into their hatched plan of sneaking out of their homes to join the rebel forces, lest they are hindered by their parents. Tultul finds it difficult to make up his mind. Tultul's father happens to discover the revolutionary poems composed by him and realizes the need of a guiding light for Tultul. He guides Tultul out of the dilemma of joining rebellion by informing him that books, and not guns, are the real agents of change. Tultul abides by the advice of his father, gets educated from one of the top universities of the world and moves ahead to be a real harbinger of change, while his friends perish into the inferno of militancy.

The plot is based on the true life-story of a young man from Assam, named Manjit Nath, who had been on the verge of turning into a militant. While touching the underlying issues of armed rebellions, teen militants and importance of education as an agent of change, the attempts to drive home the point that – there is a better way than militancy in which one can help one's community prosper.

Theme
Years of armed struggle, violent military operations, absence of economic development, and hunger for power of cunning extremist leaders color the minds of the young teenagers, drawing them into the nefarious web of teen militancy.

Cast
Adil Hussain as Deuta
Dhruv Kalra
Kritika Pande
Jitu Moni Deka
Sawrabh Rabha
Dibya Kumar Rabha
Prashant Sharma
Rahul Deb Nath

Production
The film has been shot on minimal setup consisting of Canon 5D Mk III, mostly 24–70 mm 2.8 Lens and occasionally a 75-300 for a few shot. Financial assistance to the film production was also given by the people of the locality where the film was being shot, hence the tagline, "a film by a lot of people." The film production is yet to be completed and is looking forward to crowd funding for financial assistance.

Prathamesh Krisang – Director, Writer, Cinematographer and Producer
Manjit Nath – Story
Amit Bembalkar – Screenplay and production designer
Onkar Pradhan – Editor
Anurag Saikia – Music Director
Rahul Dev Nath – Executive Producer
Ajay Jadhao – Costume designer

Development
The film has been inspired by a blog written by Manjit Nath. Prathamesh Krisang, the director of the film, read the blog and was motivated to convert the blog into a film. Adil Hussain, one of the leading actors of Indian film industry, came on board this project. The film was shot in some of the most exotic locations of Assam. It took one and a half years for the project to reach its completion as it was crowd funded. A force of young men and women from around the country volunteered for promoting the film on various social media channels. Local actors were hired to add to the authenticity of the concept.

Filming
The film was shot in some of the most exotic locations of Assam. The director made an attempt to keep the locations as close to the real as possible. The filmmaker has ensured that the film does not criticize the decision of the protagonist or his friends. The interpretation of the film and the story has been left to the audience.

Reception
The film has received many positive reviews from the audience and the critics. Media channels, from print media to electronic media, have extensively covered the film and its development and production. The support for the film garnered from people across the nation helped it to get enough financial resources from crowd funding.
From ‘The Alternative’, ‘Enajori’ and ‘Dear Cinema’ to ‘APN News’, ‘Pandolin’, ‘The Hindu’ and ‘Business Standard’, the film has been widely covered in the media.

Awards
 Golden Palm Award – Best First-time Filmmaker at 10th Mexico International Film Festival, 2015
 Official Selection in Main Competition at Kinolub Film Festival, Poland 2015
 Best Film Award at 1st Ahmednagar International Short Film Festival, 2015
 Best Editor Award at 1st Ahmednagar International Short Film Festival, 2015

References

2015 films
Films set in Assam
Indian short films
2010s Hindi-language films
2010s Assamese-language films